Project X is a 1968 independently made color science fiction film, produced and directed by William Castle, starring Christopher George, Greta Baldwin, Henry Jones, and Monte Markham. The film was distributed by Paramount Pictures and is adapted from the science fiction novels The Artificial Man (1965) and Psychogeist (1966) by L. P. Davies. The script was written by Edmund Morris and had special sequences animated by Hanna-Barbera.

Project Xs story echoes some geopolitical themes of the late 1960s, such as overpopulation, emerging genetic engineering, biological warfare, and fear of Asian dominance. It mixes in science fiction concepts like holographic devices, memory manipulation and viewing, and virtual environments to create a story about futuristic espionage.

Plot
Hagen Arnold (Christopher George) is an American spy in the year 2118. The geopolitical climate of Earth has changed significantly over the years with Sino-Asia (China) being the only other superpower and enemy of the United States. Overpopulation is a looming issue. On a covert mission to Sino-Asia, Arnold sends a message to his handlers in the U. S. stating that "The West will be destroyed in fourteen days". Prior to the mission, he had been injected with an anti-torture drug which is triggered by extreme pain.  The extreme pain will erase his mind, making it impossible for him to reveal anything to his torturers. Hagen is safely brought back to the USA and placed in cryogenic preservation until the government can devise a way to get the information out of him. With the key to discovering the secret weapon the Sino-Asians were working on locked inside his mind the American scientists resort to using a holographic memory reading device that can see inside his mind while he is asleep. The scientists also create an elaborate historical reenactment of the 1960s (Arnold has a history degree centered on this tumultuous decade) as a means to create a role-playing mechanism that may coax the information to the surface of the unsuspecting Arnold. To keep his suspicions down in the 1960s mock-up, they also create a 1960s personality matrix to implant in his mind. He is led to believe he is a criminal hiding out at a farmhouse and cannot leave lest he be arrested.

As the days tick down until the East destroys the West, Hagen comes into contact with a futuristic factory worker named Karen Summers (Greta Baldwin) who causes slight anachronistic errors with the 1960s facade. An unseen sniper scares her off, leaving Hagen suspicious but none the wiser about the facade he is experiencing. The government finds and detains Karen but tension mounts as not only has Hagen not divulged the secret they need but another agent, the unseen sniper, a man known as Gregory Gallea (Monte Markham), enters the scene in an attempt to coax the memories out of Hagen. His intention is to obtain the prized info so he can double-cross the U. S. government. Gallea has been gone for two years and presumed dead, apparently killed in action while keeping tabs on Sino-Asia. It was he who helped Hagen escape Sino-Asia.

The memory viewing and holographic machinery unleashes a mental power in Hagen. The mental power creates an energy field that kills Gallea in a spectacular display of light and fury. His death however becomes the key the scientists were looking for. They extract Gallea's brain from his body, and, while keeping it alive in a nutrient tank, perform the same brain reading exercise on it as they did with Hagen. Gallea's memories show how the Sino-Asians plan on destroying the West. Gallea injected Hagen Arnold with a myriad of medieval diseases which will, in fourteen days, make him a living plague bomb capable of spreading the diseases throughout the U. S., thus effectively destroying it from within.

The lead scientist, Crowther (Henry Jones), recalls that Arnold was in cryo-suspension most of the fourteen-day period, so there is still time to immunize him and save the West. They do so while he is unconscious and then implant a third identity into him, one in which he is living in the future, and happily married to the beautiful Karen Summers. Arnold wakes up in a bright and happy new future, a married man who will be allowed by the state to have two children with his new wife.

Cast
 Christopher George as Hagen Arnold 
 Greta Baldwin as Karen Summers 
 Henry Jones as Dr. Crowther 
 Monte Markham as Gregory Gallea 
 Harold Gould as Col. Holt 
 Phillip Pine as Lee Craig (as Phillip E. Pine) 
 Lee Delano as Dr. Tony Verity 
 Ivan Bonar as Col. Cowen 
 Robert Cleaves as Dr. George Tarvin 
 Charles Irving as Maj. Tolley 
 Sheila Bartold as Sybil Dennis 
 Patrick M. Wright as  Stover (as Patrick Wright) 
 Maryesther Denver as  Overseer 
 Keye Luke as Sen Chiu 
 Ed Prentiss as Hicks

Involvement with Hanna-Barbera

Animated sequences, representing certain action scenes, were used instead of regular live action photography. Examples include a futuristic VTOL-style jet representing the escape plane Hagen Arnold uses to escape from Sino-Asia. Another reuses a previous shot from the animated Jonny Quest TV series of an underwater elevator which terminates inside a submarine on the ocean floor. All animated and some live action sequences were further enhanced with either visual haze, wavy imagery, double exposures, reverse-negative images, monochromatic colors, and other optical effects available in the era.

See also
 List of American films of 1968

References

External links

 
 
 
 

1968 films
1960s spy films
Films directed by William Castle
Paramount Pictures films
Films based on science fiction novels
Films based on British novels
1960s science fiction films
American science fiction films
Films set in the 22nd century
1960s English-language films
1960s American films